Pantoporia is a genus of Asian butterflies sometimes called the lascars. They are predominantly with striped patterns of orange and black.

Species in the genus include:
 Pantoporia antara (Moore, 1858)
 Pantoporia assamica (Moore, 1881) – Assam lascar
 Pantoporia aurelia (Staudinger, 1886) – baby lascar
 Pantoporia bieti (Oberthür, 1894) – Tytler's lascar
 Pantoporia bruijni Oberthür
 Pantoporia consimilis (Boisduval, 1832)
 Pantoporia cyrilla (Felder & Felder, 1863)
 Pantoporia epira (Felder & Felder, 1863)
 Pantoporia dama (Moore, 1858)
 Pantoporia dindinga (Butler, 1879) – greyline lascar
 Pantoporia gordia Felder
 Pantoporia hordonia (Stoll, 1790) – common Lascar
 Pantoporia karwara Fruhstorfer – Karwar lascar
 Pantoporia mysia (Felder & Felder, 1860)
 Pantoporia sandaka (Butler, 1892) – extra lascar
 Pantoporia paraka (Butler, 1879) – Perak lascar
 Pantoporia venilia (Linnaeus, 1758) – Cape York aeroplane, black-eyed plane

References

External links
Neptini taxonomic list
Images representing Pantoporia at EOL  
Images representing Pantoporia at BOLD

 
Limenitidinae
Nymphalidae genera
Taxa named by Jacob Hübner